Project 1 Motorsport, formerly known as tolimit Motorsport, is a German auto racing team founded by Hans-Bernd Kamps and Jörg Michaels in 1993 to compete in the Porsche Carrera Cup Germany and later the Porsche Supercup.  Based in Lohne, the team has won eighteen championships in the two Porsche series, and has expanded in 2018 to the FIA World Endurance Championship.  The team changed their name from tolimit Motorsport to Project 1 in 2013. Deutsche Post has sponsored the team since 1998.

Former Carrera Cup Germany champions for the team include Christian Menzel, René Rast, and Philipp Eng, while Eng also won Project 1's sole Supercup title in 2015.

References

External links
 

Porsche Supercup teams
FIA World Endurance Championship teams
German auto racing teams
1993 establishments in Germany
Auto racing teams established in 1993
24 Hours of Le Mans teams
Deutsche Tourenwagen Masters teams